Jena I is an electoral constituency (German: Wahlkreis) represented in the Landtag of Thuringia. It elects one member via first-past-the-post voting. Under the current constituency numbering system, it is designated as constituency 37. It covers the western part of Jena.

Jena I was created for the 1994 state election. Since 2014, it has been represented by Torsten Wolf of The Left.

Geography
As of the 2019 state election, Jena I covers the western part of Jena, specifically the city districts (Ortsteile) of Ammerbach, Burgau, Closewitz, Cospeda, Göschwitz, Isserstedt, Jena-Nord, Jena-Süd, Jena-West, Jena-Zentrum, Krippendorf, Leutra, Lichtenhain, Lützeroda, Maua, Münchenroda/Remderoda, Vierzehnheiligen, and Winzerla.

Members
The constituency was first won by the Social Democratic Party (SPD) in 1994, and represented by Christine Klaus. It was won by the Christian Democratic Union (CDU) and in 1999 and represented by Reyk Seela, who was re-elected in 2004. The SPD's candidate Christoph Matschie regained the constituency in 2009. In 2014, it was won by Torsten Wolf of The Left. He was re-elected in 2019.

Election results

2019 election

2014 election

2009 election

2004 election

1999 election

1994 election

References

Electoral districts in Thuringia
1994 establishments in Germany
Jena
Constituencies established in 1994